The Slovak Socialist Republic (SSR) was from 1969 to 1990 a republic within the Czechoslovak Socialist Republic, when previously unitary Czechoslovak state changed into a federation. The name was used from 1 January 1969 until November 1989. The Slovak Republic (SR) was from 1990 to 1992 a republic within the Czech and Slovak Federative Republic, that is now the independent Slovakia.

History
After the occupation of Czechoslovakia in 1968 liberalisation reforms were halted and then reversed. The only significant exception was the federalization of the country. The former centralist state of Czechoslovakia was divided in two: the Czech Socialist Republic and Slovak Socialist Republic by the Constitutional Law of Federation of 28 October 1968, which came into effect on 1 January 1969. New national parliaments (the Czech National Council and the Slovak National Council) were created and the old parliament of Czechoslovakia was renamed the "Federal Assembly" and was divided in two chambers: the House of the People and the House of Nations. Very complicated rules of voting were put in effect.

Federalization was notional – all the real power was kept by the Communist Party. The increased number of "parliaments" conveniently provided more positions for party members though their role was just symbolic.

After the fall of socialism in Czechoslovakia, the word "socialist" was dropped in the names of the two republics, i.e. the Slovak Socialist Republic was renamed Slovak Republic (still part of Czechoslovakia, since April 1990 of the Czech and Slovak Federative Republic).

The complicated system of parliamentary voting (there were de facto 5 different bodies each having right of veto) was kept after the fall of socialism, complicating and delaying political decisions during radical changes in the economy.

In November 1992, the federal parliament voted to dissolve the country officially on 31 December 1992. As of 1 January 1993, the Slovak Republic became an independent state named Slovakia.

See also
Constitutional Law of Federation
History of Czechoslovakia
Czech Socialist Republic (1969–1989)/Czech Republic (1990–1992)
Czech and Slovak Federative Republic
Slovak Republic (1939–1945)

External links
 Constitutional Law of Federation (in Czech)

Czechoslovak Socialist Republic
Communism in Slovakia
Former socialist republics
States and territories disestablished in 1993